RWD Magazine (also known as RWD or RWDmag) is a British-based magazine which features music, style, sport, gaming, film, technology, news, interviews and charts on hip hop, grime, dubstep, R&B, UK garage, drum and bass and U.S. house music. Running from 2001–2014 It was released monthly, distributing 98,300 copies each time and was ABC certified. It was considered the largest magazine on youth music and lifestyle in the United Kingdom.

As well as the magazine, RWDmag has a website which features music videos, tracks and artist profiles. RWDmag.com was the first major website to champion grime music.

History 
RWD Magazine became a well known name in UK underground urban music circles in mid to late 2003. This coincided with the rise of a new urban music genre, which later became popularly referred to as grime. Founded by Nigel, Dacre, Martin and Chewy.

RWD Magazine provided a platform for emerging unsigned artists to get their names and their faces into every popular underground music outlet. This worked by aspiring artists paying to feature within the magazine. This may not have seemed very desirable at first, but the magazine's healthy distribution and circulation made this more attractive. The magazine enjoyed a relatively healthy distribution and circulation as readers could pick up the magazine for free.

This new platform (along with music channel Channel U) appealed to many aspiring artists from the grime scene and allowed them to do independently what they could have previously only done with the backing of a major record label.

Part of the success of the magazine was driven by its official website, which was buoyed by its popular forum named 'RWD forum' both launched by Lex Johnson, the most central point being the "Grime Music" forum. This forum allowed for the discussion of everything to do with the grime scene and regularly enjoyed visits from big names in the grime scene who occasionally also posted.

2000–2004 
During this time, the magazine focused on the intersection between UK garage and the birth of grime music. The website was built, launched and promoted by teenage online director Alex Donne Johnson who later went on to form his own creative agency, Dazzle Ship. During this period, the website won a number of awards including London Business of the Year, UK Garage Awards: Best Website 2002 and Sidewinder Peoples Choice Awards: Best Magazine 2013.

As part of the marketing campaign for the website, The Booo Krooo were born. They were soon co-signed by Missy Elliott asking to be featured in the cartoon for her hit single "Work It". The Booo Krooo went on to secure a 6 episode broadcast series on British TV channel Channel U and produced a music video with UK garage producer Sticky, famous for hits such as the track (also named) "Booo!".

2007–2008 
In mid-2007, RWD Magazine underwent a number of management changes, one of the most important being a change of editor. The new management wanted to expand the magazine's audience in order to feature all types of music that might appeal to a younger generation. In order to achieve this, the content and appearance of the magazine and website changed, much to the disappointment of the users. This resulted in an exodus of users, establishing their own forums; namely ViP2 Forum which evolved from the Flashback993 forums that were established in 2005. Grime Forum was also created where grime music fans who used to post in the RWDmag forum created their own forum website named Grime Forum with its own connected "Grimepedia" encyclopedia of the genre as well as a music store. During this time both SBTV and GRM Daily managed to adapt to the new video based YouTube generation and took the top spot as the source for grime content on the internet.

2009 
On 1 April 2009, RWD launched a new and redesigned website with extended content under the different genres and enhanced social networking features which give users the ability to manage their own profiles, keep in touch with friends, as well as track forum activity.

2014 
RWD Magazine launched a football show known as FilthyFellas on YouTube on 12 September ahead of the 2014–15 Premier League season. The show released a new episode every Monday at 7pm following the matches of the weekend, and is known for its amusing and mocking element of "banter" that it contains.

References

External links 
 RWDmag official site
 RWDmag designer
The Booo Krooo
Dazzle Ship 
"Booo Krooo", first in the grime comedy genre

Music magazines published in the United Kingdom
Online magazines published in the United Kingdom
Lifestyle magazines published in the United Kingdom
Monthly magazines published in the United Kingdom
2001 establishments in the United Kingdom
Magazines established in 2001